Karl Rove: Courage and Consequence  is a grassroots funded  compilation of rock songs released on March 3, 2010  in anticipation of Karl Rove's similarly titled memoir. The subtitle of the record is The Unabridged Audio. It was conceived as "an anticipatory sonic recollection of the gross misdeeds attributable to Rove over the past decade".

It is both a compilation album and digital download package, as well as a direct lampoon of Courage and Consequence: My Life As a Conservative in the Fight written by Karl Rove. Project: Courage and Consequence  was conceived of, in tandem with the compilation LP to Google bomb the memoir of the similar title and "mess with the search results"

Track listing
 The Heavenly States - "A Man For Our Times"
 Rival Dickens - "Forget The Naughts"
 Have Special Power - "A Rove By Any Other Name"
 Assistant Cobra - "The Art Of Distraction"
 Lambs of Abortion - "New American Century"
 We're Gonna Fight The Eskimos Next (Members of Mount Vicious, Vitamin Party and Bwuh) - "Don't Praise The Machine"
 Cartographer - "The Biggest Asshole In The World"
 Death Dream - "Karl Rove, Let's Get Dirty"
 Generalissimo - "Swarm"
 Cold Lake - "Courage and Consequence"
 Hurry Up Shotgun - "Car Bomb"
 The United Sons Of Toil - "Invention Vs Innovation"
 Victory And Associates - "Lies, and the Lying Liars that Sell Them"

References

Further reading
 An interview with curator Conan Neutron in the East Bay Express
 Seismic Wave Entertainment website
 Article about the compilation on Thirdcoast Digest
 "We Just Gave Karl Rove's Book a New Soundtrack" Article on Huffingtonpost

External links
 Project Courage and Consequence Official Site
 Project Courage and Consequence Twitter
 Courage and Consequence Blog
 Courage and Consequence Last.Fm page
 Mike Malloy Interview 01-23-2010
 Mike Malloy Interview 03-05-2010 pt1
 Mike Malloy Interview 03-05-2010 pt 2

2010 compilation albums
Culture jamming
Kickstarter-funded albums